Catweasel may refer to:
Individual Computers Catweasel, a floppy disk controller 
Catweazle, a children's television series 
Catweazle (wrestler), an English professional wrestler